Spiraeopsis is a genus of flowering plant in the family Cunoniaceae, native to eastern tropical Asia. The genus was first described by Friedrich Miquel in 1856.

Species
, Plants of the World Online accepted the following species:
Spiraeopsis brassii L.M.Perry
Spiraeopsis celebica (Blume) Miq.
Spiraeopsis clemensiae L.M.Perry
Spiraeopsis fulva (Schltr.) L.M.Perry
Spiraeopsis papuana (Pulle) L.M.Perry
Spiraeopsis rufa (Schltr.) L.M.Perry

References

Cunoniaceae
Oxalidales genera